The flatjaw minnow  (Tampichthys mandibularis) is a species of cyprinid fish endemic to Mexico.  It is considered critically endangered.

References

Cyprinid fish of North America
Freshwater fish of Mexico
Fish described in 1977
Tampichthys
Taxonomy articles created by Polbot